Cheloterma is a genus of moths of the family Crambidae. It contains only one species, Cheloterma invidiosa, which is found in India (Assam).

References

Pyraustinae
Taxa named by Edward Meyrick
Monotypic moth genera
Moths of Asia
Crambidae genera